Green Valley Football Club, or simply FC Green Valley, is an Indian professional football club from Guwahati, Assam. Formed in 2010, the club went straight into professional football and got accepted into I-League 2nd Division, the second tier of football in India. They currently compete in the GSA Super Division Football League, alongside the top division Assam State Premier League and Bordoloi Trophy.

History
Green Valley Football Club was founded in 2010 in Assam. In January 2012 they were officially certified by the All India Football Federation to participate in the I-League 2nd Division, the second tier of football in India. The finished 4th out of 7 teams in the group stage.

They have also participated in 2013 I-League 2nd Division, finishing 8th out of 9 teams in group B.

Home stadium

FC Green Valley plays all its home matches at the Nehru Stadium in Guwahati, which has a capacity of 
15,000 spectators.

Honours

League 
 Assam State Premier League
Runners-up (3): 2012–13, 2013–14, 2015

Cup 
Bordoloi Trophy
Runners-up: (1): 2014
NN Bhattacharya Knock-Out  Football Tournament
Champions (1): 2022
Amba Medhi Football Tournament
Runners-up (1): 2007

See also
 List of football clubs in Assam
 Assam State Premier League
 Gauhati Town Club
 Guwahati FC

References

External links
 FC Green Valley at Soccerway
FC Green Valley on Facebook
FC Green Valley at Global Sports Archive

Association football clubs established in 2010
2010 establishments in Assam
Football clubs in Assam
Sport in Guwahati
I-League 2nd Division clubs